The Hébé class was a class of six 38-gun (later 40-gun) frigates of the French Navy, designed in 1781 by Jacques-Noël Sané. The name ship of the class. Hébé, was also the basis for the British s after the ship had been captured.

Ships in class

References 

French Warships in the Age of Sail 1786–1861: Design, Construction, Careers and Fates (Rif Winfield and Stephen S. Roberts). Seaforth Publishing, 2015. .

 
Frigate classes
Ship classes of the French Navy